Bùi Trần Vũ (born 10 October 1989) is a Vietnamese footballer who is playing for V-League club Sài Gòn .

Club career

Sài Gòn
Following the 2016 season, Trần Vũ joined Sài Gòn on a 2-year deal.

References 

1989 births
Living people
Vietnamese footballers
Association football midfielders
V.League 1 players
Hoang Anh Gia Lai FC players
Saigon FC players
People from Ninh Thuận province